Corwin may refer to:

People
Corwin (surname)
Corwin (given name)

Places in the United States
Corwin Township, Logan County, Illinois
Corwin, Henry County, Indiana, an extinct town 
Corwin, Tippecanoe County, Indiana, an extinct town
Corwin, Kansas
Corwin, New York, a hamlet in the town of Newfane
Corwin, Ohio, a village
Corwin, Wisconsin, a ghost town
Salem Township, Warren County, Ohio, previously named Corwin Township
Cape Corwin, Alaska
Corwin Formation, geological formation in Alaska

Entertainment
Corwin (film), a 1996 documentary
Corwin (TV series), a Canadian television series (1969-1971)

Other uses
USS Corwin, two ships
Corwin Manufacturing Company, an early American automobile company

See also
Curwen, a surname
Korwin (disambiguation)